Alpha Zeta is a professional fraternity for students and industry professionals in the agriculture and natural resources fields. Founded in 1897 at Ohio State University, Alpha Zeta is the first and oldest collegiate society for agriculture. Today, Alpha Zeta has over 125,000 alumni and 1,000 student members at thirty universities.

History 
The fraternity was founded on November 4, 1897 by Charles Burkett, John Cunningham, and ten other agriculture students at Ohio State University.

Chapters 
Chapters are named for individuals prominent in some way with respect to agriculture or after the locality of the chapter.

 Townshend - Ohio State University - 1897
 Morrill - Pennsylvania State University - 1898
 Morrow - University of Illinois at Urbana-Champaign - 1900
 Cornell - Cornell University - 1901
 Kedzie - Michigan State University - 1902
 Granite - University of New Hampshire - 1903
 Nebraska - University of Nebraska-Lincoln - 1904
 North Carolina - North Carolina State University - 1904
 Wilson - Iowa State University - 1905
 Green Mountain - University of Vermont - 1905
 La Grange - University of Minnesota - 1905
 Centennial - Colorado State University - 1906
 Babcock - University of Wisconsin–Madison - 1906
 Maine - University of Maine-Orono - 1906
 Missouri - University of Missouri - 1907
 Elliott - Washington State University - 1907
 Purdue - Purdue University - 1908
 California - University of California-Berkeley - 1908
 Kansas - Kansas State University - 1909
 Dacotah - North Dakota State University - 1909
 Montana - Montana State University - 1912
 Scovell - University of Kentucky - 1912
 Georgia - University of Georgia - 1914
 Delaware - University of Delaware - 1916
 Oklahoma - Oklahoma State University - 1916
 Florida - University of Florida - 1922
 Cook - Rutgers University - 1922
 South Dakota - South Dakota State University - 1924
 Virginia - Virginia Tech - 1932
 Nevada - University of Nevada, Reno - 1963
 California Eta - California State University, Chico - 2004
 California Epsilon - California State University, Fresno - 2005

Notable members 

 Morris N. Abrams - Louisiana educator (LSU)
 John R. Block - Secretary of Agriculture under Ronald Reagan
 Norman Borlaug - Nobel laureate
 Earl Butz - U.S. Secretary of Agriculture (1971–1976) (Purdue, '31)
 Robert C. Baker - Professor Emeritus of Food Science, Cornell University; Inventor of the chicken nugget (Cornell '43)
 Herman Cain - former chairman and CEO of Godfather's Pizza
 Walter Clore - Father of the Washington Wine Industury
 Dwight D. Eisenhower - U.S. President
Arthur Rose Eldred - Agriculturalist, first Eagle Scout recognized by the Boy Scouts of America (Cornell '16)
 Dan R. Glickman - U.S. Secretary of Agriculture (1995–2001); current president of the Motion Picture Association of America
Edwin Jackson Kyle - Former U.S. ambassador to Guatemala (1945–1948), namesake of Texas A&M's Kyle Field (Cornell, '02)
 Henry C. Wallace - U.S. Secretary of Agriculture (1921–1924) (Honorary, '22)
 William Jardine - U.S. Secretary of Agriculture (1925–1929) (Kansas, '11)
 Henry A. Wallace - Vice President of the United States, U.S. Secretary of Agriculture (1933–1940), Founder of Pioneer Hi-Bred, Secretary of Commerce (Wilson, '08)
 Ezra Taft Benson - U.S. Secretary of Agriculture (1953–1961) (Honorary, '53)
 Orville Freeman - U.S. Secretary of Agriculture (1961–1969), Minnesota Governor (Honorary, '62)
 Clifford Hardin - U.S. Secretary of Agriculture (1969–1971) (Purdue, '53)
 Richard Lyng - U.S. Secretary of Agriculture (1986–1989) (Wilson, '74)
 Albert Schatz - Co-discoverer of streptomycin with Selman Waksman (Cook)
 Selman Waksman - Discoverer of streptomycin and coined the word "antibiotic", Nobel laureate (Cook)
Kenneth E. Wing - President (1992–2002) of SUNY Cobleskill (Cornell '58)
 Clayton Yeutter - U.S. Secretary of Agriculture (1989–1991) (Nebraska, '50)
Lester Brown - Founder of the Earth Policy Institute (Cook)

See also 

 Professional fraternities and sororities

References 

Student organizations established in 1897
Professional fraternities and sororities in the United States
1897 establishments in Ohio
Professional Fraternity Association